Vivek Dhakar is a politician  and current ex- MLA from Mandalgarh constituency in Bhilwara district. He was elected in a by-election in 2018 as a candidate for Indian National Congress.

References

Living people
People from Bhilwara district
Indian National Congress politicians from Rajasthan
1977 births